Paul Lamb (March 22, 1901–April 1986) was an American politician who served for one term as a Republican in the Kansas State Senate, from 1961 to 1964. He was succeeded by John Steineger.

References

1901 births
1986 deaths
Date of death missing
Republican Party Kansas state senators
20th-century American politicians
People from Caney, Kansas